HMS Ledbury, the second ship of the name, is a  of the Royal Navy. She was launched in December 1979 and commissioned on 11 June 1981, the second ship of her class. She cost £65 million at time of building, which was at the time the most expensive cost-per-metre for any class of ship built by the Royal Navy. Most of this cost went into the research and development of Ledburys glass reinforced plastic hull.

Operational history
Ledbury is attached to the Second Mine Countermeasures Squadron, based in Portsmouth.

1981–1990
Ledbury was not involved in the Falklands Conflict itself but arrived in the South Atlantic in July 1982 with sister ship   to clear the waters around the islands of Argentinian mines.

2001–2010
Ledbury underwent a docking maintenance period, commencing in June 2009, to fit the new Seafox mine disposal equipment.

2011–present
In 2013, Ledbury twice joined NATO Mine Countermeasure groups, one deployment taking her to the Mediterranean Sea, the other to the Baltic Sea. In June 2014, Ledbury took part in the commemorations to mark the 70th anniversary of the Normandy landings.

Ledbury entered refit in 2015 during which her engines were replaced with newer, more efficient diesels. Following sea trials, Ledbury took part in Exercise Joint Warrior off the west coast of Scotland. It was announced in March 2017 that Ledbury will deploy to the Persian Gulf later 2017 to relieve sister ship , it is expected she will remain in the region for at least three years.

Ledbury is now permanently based in Bahrain at HMS Jufair as part of 4 Minehunters of 9th Mine Countermeasures Squadron supported by a Royal Fleet Auxiliary Bay Class on Operation Kipion.

References

External links

 

Hunt-class mine countermeasures vessels
1979 ships